Dingo Creek, a perennial stream of the Manning River catchment, is located in the Mid North Coast region of New South Wales, Australia.

Course and features
The river flows generally west to a point east of Tapin Tops National Park, then south, joined by the Bobin and Caparra creeks, before reaching its confluence with the Manning River, at Kilawarra, west of Wingham. The river descends  over its  course.

The Manning River eventually flows into the Tasman Sea through a minor delta east of Taree.

Etymology
The traditional custodians of the land surrounding the Dingo Creek are the Australian Aboriginal Birpi people of the Bundjalung nation. The name of the creek is derived from the Aboriginal Kattang word tapin, meaning dingo, a subspecies of the grey wolf.

See also

 List of rivers of Australia
 List of rivers in New South Wales (A-K)
 Rivers of New South Wales

References

External links
 

 

Rivers of New South Wales
Rivers of the Hunter Region
Mid North Coast
City of Greater Taree